Maurice Heerdink (12 August 1955, The Hague) is a Dutch painter known mostly for his subtle painted photo-realistic male nude art.

In 1981 Heerdink graduated from the Royal Art Academy in The Hague in the Netherlands.
After extensive travels through North- and Middle America he drew a series about the iconography of the Maya culture.

Between 1976 and 1997 he painted several works of Mathilde Willink, the ex-wife of Carel Willink that were shown in The Uur van de Wolf and in the documentary Mathilde Willink Superpoes, 2005.

From 1989 through 2000 he illustrated over 100 books and magazines and had 11 short stories published.

During the 1990s, Heerdink developed into a modern Caravaggist, and drama and lightning became elementary in his paintings.
Heerdink focused on the mythology from Greece and the bible. He created a series about Saint Sebastian, Acteon, Sisyphus, Prometheus and the flagellation of Christ. 
In 1999 he received the public award first prize for his painting The Return Of The New Messiah during the exhibition The Jesus Mystery.
The documentary The Playful Eroticism of Maurice Heerdink was shown on MVS Gay TV Amsterdam in 1998.

Between 2004 and 2005 he portrayed theatre legends like Ellen Vogel, Jenny Arean, Willem Nijholt, Johnny Kraaijkamp jr. and Aus Greidanus jr. 
These works were a part of his 2005 exhibition in the Westfries Museum, that was opened by actress Sacha Bulthuis.
In 2011 he portrayed several dancers.

In November 2014 the book The Art Of Maurice Heerdink was published.

In 2018, he started a collaboration with German musician and filmmaker Ronny Strehmann for the Strehmann Music Project which resulted in paintings and music videos.

Heerdink's works can be found in private art collections in Europe and the United States, as well as museums.

Series 
"1980-1988 iconography of the Mayaculture"
"1990- Male Physique"
"2001-2007 mythology from Greece and the Bible: Saint Sebastian, Acteon, Sisyphus, Prometheus and the flagellation of Christ."
"2005-2006 Theater Portraits Ellen Vogel, Jenny Arean, Willem Nijholt, Johnny Kraaijkamp jr. and Aus Greidanus jr and 2011Marne van Opstal - NDT."
"2001-2014 Falconryj"
"2016-2017 Waterscapes"
"2018- Strehmann music project"

Exhibitions 
"1981 Ministry of Finance, The Hague"
"1985 solo - Hotel des Indes, The Hague"
"1998 group - Gaygames Amsterdam"
"2006 solo – Westfriesmuseum, Hoorn"
"2016 solo – Museum Soest, Soest"
"2018 group – Zandvoort's Museum, Zandvoort"
"2018 group – Museum Swaensteyn, Voorburg"

Books 
1999 Het Jezus Mysterie Catalogus
1999 Mathilde - Joop van Loon
2002 Loïc - Alain Meyer (Frankrijk)
2007 Louis de Bourbon - Claude Puzin (Frankrijk)
2011 100 Artists of the male Figure (USA)
2014 The Art Of Maurice Heerdink - Maurice Heerdink
2018 Quentin Crisp - Nigel Kelly
2015 Mathilde

Television 
"1998 -The Playfull Eroticism of Maurice Heerdink documantery for MVS Gay tv Amsterdam"
"2005 - Het Uur van de Wolf: Mathilde Willink Superpoes documentary with Heerdink paintings about Mathilde Willink, the ex-wife of Carel Willink"

Projects 
2013 Video: Illuminated Bodies, The Gift, Summer 2013: my states of mind.
2018 Musik Projekt Strehmann. Videos: Free, Kartenhaus
2019 Strehmann-Heerdink videos: Petits Soleils, Oderburch, They Are Here

Prizes 
"1999 - Public award first prize for the painting The Return Of The New Messiah during the exhibition The Jesus Mystery."

References

External links 
 Film met voorbeelden van kunst met mythologische en bijbelse thema's
 Film met de theaterportretten
 Film over het onstaan van het schilderij Forbidden Fruit: De Vliet
 Officiële website

1955 births
Living people
Dutch painters
Dutch male painters